XO, Kitty is an upcoming romantic dramedy streaming series created by Jenny Han for Netflix. The series, a spin-off of the To All the Boys film series (itself an adaptation of Han's book trilogy To All the Boys I've Loved Before), marks the first Netflix television series to be spun-off from a Netflix original film. Han is serving as writer and executive producer in addition to being a showrunner. It features Kitty Covey going on her own journey to find true love. Anna Cathcart is reprising the title role.

Synopsis
Kitty Covey, who believes she is extremely knowledgeable on love, moves halfway across the world, aiming to reconnect with her long-distance boyfriend. She finds, however, that a relationship is much more complex when it is your own feelings of love at risk.

Cast and characters

Main
 Anna Cathcart as Kitty
 Choi Min-young as Dae
 Anthony Keyvan as Q
 Gia Kim as Yuri
 Sang Heon Lee as Min Ho
 Peter Thurnwald as Alex
 Regan Aliya as Juliana

Recurring
 Yunjin Kim as Jina
 Michael K. Lee as Professor Lee
 Jocelyn Shelfo as Madison

Production
In March 2021, it was announced that a series spin-off to To All the Boys is in development, with each episode being a half-hour romantic comedy. The series will be developed as a Netflix exclusive, from Awesomeness and ACE Entertainment. The books' original author Jenny Han was reported to be the creator, writer and executive producer as well as writing the script for the pilot with Siobhan Vivian. Anna Cathcart was also reported to be reprising her role as Kitty Covey. Six months later, Netflix ordered ten episodes along with announcing other crew members. Sascha Rothchild and Matt Kaplan joined Han as executive producers while the former will also be the showrunner along with Han. On April 5, 2022, Choi Min-yeong, Anthony Keyvan, Gia Kim, Sang Heon Lee, Peter Thurnwald, and Regan Aliyah were cast as series regulars while Yunjin Kim, Michael K. Lee, and Jocelyn Shelfo joined the cast in recurring roles. By that date, production had begun in Seoul.

Episodes

References

2020s American comedy-drama television series
2020s American romantic comedy television series
2020s American television series debuts
2020s romantic drama television series
American romantic drama television series
American television spin-offs
Live action television shows based on films
English-language Netflix original programming
Television series about couples
Television series about teenagers
Television series produced in Seoul
Television shows based on American novels
Upcoming comedy television series
Upcoming drama television series
Upcoming Netflix original programming